Osman Yıldırım (born March 25, 1996) is a Turkish Greco-Roman wrestler competing in the 130 kg division of Greco-Roman wrestling. He is a member of the ASKİ Spor Club.

Career 
Osman Yıldırım, competing in Greco-Roman wrestling 130 kilograms category, won a silver medal in the U23 World Wrestling Championships, which was held in Romanian capital of Bucharest.

Osman Yıldırım loses to Sergey Semenov from Russia in final of men's Greco-Roman 130 kg in Belgrade, Serbia. Turkish Greco-Roman wrestler Osman Yıldırım on Monday earned another silver medal in Serbia in the final of the Individual World Cup with his defeat to a Russian wrestler.

In 2022, he won the gold medal in his event at the Vehbi Emre & Hamit Kaplan Tournament held in Istanbul, Turkey.He won the gold medal in his event at the  Bolat Turlykhanov Cup the second of the ranking series of United World Wrestling held in Almaty, Kazakhstan. He won the gold medal in the 130 kg event at the 2022 Mediterranean Games held in Oran, Algeria. Yıldırım beat his Egyptian opponent Abdellatif Mohamed 5-1 to win gold in the 130-kilogram final. He won the silver medal in the men's Greco-Roman 130 kg event at the 2021 Islamic Solidarity Games held in Konya, Turkey.

Major results

References

External links
 

1996 births
Living people
Turkish male sport wrestlers
Wrestlers at the 2019 European Games
European Wrestling Championships medalists
Competitors at the 2018 Mediterranean Games
Islamic Solidarity Games medalists in wrestling
Islamic Solidarity Games competitors for Turkey
Competitors at the 2022 Mediterranean Games
Mediterranean Games medalists in wrestling
Mediterranean Games gold medalists for Turkey
21st-century Turkish people